{{Taxobox
| image = 
| image_caption = 
| regnum = Animalia
| phylum = Arthropoda
| classis = Insecta
| ordo = Lepidoptera
| familia = Erebidae
| genus = Sinarella
| species = S. discisigna
| binomial = Sinarella discisigna
| binomial_authority = (Moore, 1883)
| synonyms = 
Leucinodes discisigna Moore, 1883Nodaria discisigna Moore, 1883
}}Sinarella discisigna (sometimes as Nodaria discisigna''), is a moth of the family Erebidae first described by Frederic Moore in 1883. It is found in Sri Lanka, India, Nepal and Thailand.

References

Moths of Asia
Moths described in 1883
Herminiinae